Series 19 of British television drama The Bill was broadcast from 1 January until 31 December 2003. The series consisted of 106 episodes, being the longest series broadcast during the show's final decade, and also included the show's first live broadcast, "Fatal Consequences". This series built upon the serialized format previously introduced by new producer Paul Marquess in Series 18, with the series following on from the previous series by removing and replacing a mass number of characters. The most high-profile exit was that of Sergeant Matt Boyden, whose death was part of a crossover with new spin-off series Murder Investigation Team. Actor Tony O'Callaghan, who was with the show for 12 years, became the fourth character with over ten years on the show to have been written out in the 18 months since Marquess took over, with three of those four characters being killed off.

This series saw the show celebrate its 20th Anniversary on air with both a live episode and an episode featuring one of the show's most ambitious stunts to date, where PC Des Taviner is supposedly killed in an explosion in a gas tower after being exposed as the culprit of the Sun Hill fire, which claimed the lives of six officers back in April 2002. This storyline also saw a guest stint by former DI Sally Johnson (Jaye Griffiths), who ultimately exposes Taviner and manages to bully DC Danny Glaze into tendering his resignation, in fear of his part in the plot to frame murder suspect Jeff Simpson being revealed.

For the live broadcast, a storyline was devised whereby DC Juliet Becker (Rae Baker) was held hostage in the back of a police van at knifepoint, being fatally stabbed as a result. Despite only being in the show for five months, the storyline paved the way for Baker's exit. This episode also featured a live stunt in which PC Gary Best fell from the roof of the station after fighting with his father's killer. All but three of the current cast members featured in the live broadcast, and thus, due to its success on the night, a second live broadcast was commissioned for 2005, to celebrate the 50th Anniversary of ITV1.

After the show moved focus onto more soap opera type storylines in series 18, several long-term plots from this series focused on the personal lives of the characters. PC Nick Klein, who became addicted to cocaine in series 18, escalated into a crack addict that resulted in him having a stint in rehab. PC Luke Ashton was involved in a plot over a number of months that saw him come to terms with his homosexuality, marrying and later divorcing PC Kerry Young before leaving the show, actor Scott Neal's second stint ending after just over a year. Sergeant June Ackland took centre stage as she began a relationship with new character Gabriel Kent, portrayed by former Grange Hill and EastEnders actor Todd Carty, only for it to be revealed he was her long lost son; Kent would go on to become one of the show's most notorious villains. PC Jim Carver also had a major, long-term storyline, marrying victim of crime Marie Graham (Melanie Hill), later becoming subject to domestic violence.

On 16 October 2013, the complete series was released on DVD in Australia as a Region 0, playable anywhere in the world. The DVD synopsis uses the original episode numbering system, rather than the Episode names, which weren't used from 2002 to 2007.

Cast changes

Arrivals
 PC Cameron Tait (Thinking Out Loud-)
 Sgt Sheelagh Murphy (False Pride-)
 PC Honey Harman (Throw for A Loss-)
 PC Polly Page (The Square Apple-) - Returning character
 Sgt Dale Smith (Boomerang Part 2-) - Returning character
 DC Juliet Becker (Rescue-Fatal Consequences)
 DC Ramani DeCosta (Count Me Out-)
 PC Gabriel Kent (Home Run (Part 1)-)
 DC Terry Perkins (Truth-)
 CADO Dean McVerry (The Dirty Dozen-)
 DC Rob Thatcher (Haunted, Part One-)
 PC Yvonne Hemmingway (Antecedent-)
 SRO Marilyn Chambers (Fatality-)
 DI Neil Manson (Chasing the Dragon-)

Departures
 DC Duncan Lennox – Returns to M.I.T. after his secondment to Sun Hill ends
 Sgt Craig Gilmore – Requests transfer after being seriously assaulted
 Sgt Matthew Boyden – Shot dead on the order of his estranged daughter
 PC Gemma Osbourne – Resigns after helping an illegal immigrant escape the country
 PC Luke Ashton – Transfers after breakdown of marriage with PC Kerry Young
 PC Ruby Buxton – Resigns after committing perjury
 CADO Roberta Cryer – Dismissed after ignoring an urgent assistance call
 DC Danny Glaze – Resigns after being exposed for the 2002 station fire coverup
 DC Juliet Becker – Fatally stabbed during hostage situation
 DC Mickey Webb - Transfers to MIT (temporary departure)

Episodes

References

2003 British television seasons
The Bill series